Andy DiGelsomina is an American composer, lead guitarist, songwriter, orchestrator, arranger, blogger, and producer.

Life and career
DiGelsomina was born in Springfield, Ohio. His father was a fan of rock music, while his fraternal grandfather preferred traditional art music which made both genres very impactful during the composer's early years.

Though the music of Elton John and Jerry Goldsmith started his lifelong love of music, DiGelsomina first aimed at becoming a fiction writer, shunning high school to earn a college degree at the age of eighteen. It was around that time that he heard the first Black Sabbath album and subsequently changed his major to music. His time in school was cut short when he abandoned the institutionalized education system and instead became a determined autodidact.

His next musical revelation came in the form of the operas of Richard Wagner, which spurred him to study orchestral scores and instruments, greatly expanding his range as a composer. He cites Ludwig van Beethoven's late-era string quartets as having had a profound effect on his writing during that time as well.

DiGelsomina first came to prominence in 2010, upon working with ex-Rainbow vocalist Graham Bonnet for the Lyraka album, Lyraka Volume 1, an album he wrote, played lead guitar on, and co-produced. Since then he has recorded with many people in the heavy metal genre, including Mark Boals, Al Atkins, and Veronica Freeman, among others.

In recent years DiGelsomina has reduced his involvement in the Rock genre in favor of writing Art music for the Symphony Orchestra, choir, and related instruments, as well as incorporating Aleatoric music, electronic, avante-garde, and Romantic compositional elements. This has resulted in the release of four symphonies, movements of which are featured on his blog.

It was announced May 14, 2020 that DiGelsomina would be returning to the heavy metal genre, working on a solo album entitled "Sic Itur Ad Astra" with ex-Candlemass vocalist Robert Lowe.

Reception
Heavy metal critic Martin Popoff referred to DiGelsomina point blank as a "great songwriter", and Metal Rules magazine lauded the compositional style on Lyraka Volume 1, calling it a "type of cross-fertilized metal that...I've never heard before. Bands mixing different styles and influences is nothing new, but Lyraka have really created something special". DiGelsomina refers to this style as "Serial Vignette Composition".

Discography

Lyraka
Lyraka Volume 1 
Released: November 2010
Label: Mermaid's Song

Lyraka Volume 2 
Release: TBA
Label: Mermaid's Song

Andy DiGelsomina
Symphony no. 1
Release: October, 2015
Label: Phoenix Rising

Symphony no. 2
Release: May, 2017
Label: Phoenix Rising

Symphony no. 3
Release: August, 2018
Label: Phoenix Rising

Symphony no. 4
Release: August, 2019
Label: Phoenix Rising

DiGelsomina
Sic Itur Ad Astra
Release: TBA
Label: Phoenix Rising

References

External links 
 
 

American male classical composers
21st-century classical composers
Living people
People from Springfield, Ohio
Songwriters from Ohio
American heavy metal guitarists
Record producers from Ohio
21st-century composers
American classical composers
Guitarists from Ohio
Classical musicians from Ohio
Year of birth missing (living people)
21st-century American male musicians
American male songwriters